Rebecca Kiting (born 8 May 1991) is an Australian football (soccer) player, who currently plays for Canberra United in the Australian W-League. At the age of 17, she was one of the original players on the team during its inaugural season in 2008.

References

External links
 Canberra United FC profile

1991 births
Living people
Australian women's soccer players
Canberra United FC players
Women's association football defenders